Trosia dimas, the rosy ermine, is a moth in the family Megalopygidae. It is found in Colombia, Venezuela, Ecuador, Brazil, and Peru.

Taxonomy 
The first description of this species was by Pieter Cramer in 1775, who named it Bombyx dimas. Subsequent authors placed it in the genera Chrysauge, Idalus, and Sciathos until Harrison Dyar, following Hübner in 1822, assigned it to Trosia, where it has remained.

Description 
The head, abdomen, and legs are reddish and the tarsi black, spotted with white. The collar and thorax are yellowish buff, the latter spotted with red. The forewings are greenish yellow, with a postmedial row of black spots. The hindwings are roseate. The underside is dull roseate. In this species, the costa of the forewings is of the same color as the wing.

Habitat 
The Byrsonima coccolobifolia is the host plant of Trosia dimas.

Range 
Trosia Dimas has been observed in Colombia, Venezuela, Ecuador, Brazil and Peru. Observations recorded in various collections and citizen science initiatives suggest the range where this species occurs is from South America to North America

Taxonomy 
Trosia dimas is a species in the genus Trosia. It was first described by Pieter Cramer in 1775.

References

Moths described in 1775
Megalopygidae
Taxa named by Pieter Cramer